β-Santalene synthase (EC 4.2.3.83) is an enzyme with systematic name (2E,6E)-farnesyl diphosphate lyase (cyclizing, (–)-β-santalene-forming). This enzyme catalyses the following chemical reaction

 (2E,6E)-farnesyl diphosphate  (–)-β-santalene + diphosphate

The enzyme synthesizes a mixture of sesquiterpenoids from (2E,6E)-farnesyl diphosphate.

References

External links 
 

EC 4.2.3